Henry Croal (27 March 1891 – 2 June 1948) was a cricketer from British Guiana. He played in nine first-class matches for British Guiana from 1910 to 1923.

See also
 List of Guyanese representative cricketers

References

External links
 

1891 births
1948 deaths
Cricketers from British Guiana